Suela Janina (born June 28, 1976) is an Albanian diplomat who was appointed as Ambassador of the Republic of Albania to the European Union on July 31, 2014.  She also serves as Ambassador to Belgium and Luxembourg.

Biography
Janina graduated from the Faculty of Law of the University of Tirana, earned a Master's degree in Democracy and Human rights from a program run jointly by the University of Sarajevo and University of Bologna and a PhD in international law by the University of Tirana.

References

Albanian women ambassadors
Ambassadors of Albania to the European Union
1976 births
Living people
University of Tirana alumni
University of Sarajevo alumni
University of Bologna alumni